George Mountford was a footballer who played for Burslem Port Vale in the early 1890s.

Career
Mountford joined Burslem Port Vale in November 1892 and made his debut in a 2–1 loss to Lincoln City at the Athletic Ground on 3 December that year. He scored two goals in his next two Second Division games (in a 4–2 win over Northwich Victoria at Drill Field on 8 April) and also made a cup appearance but was released at the end of the season.

Career statistics
Source:

References

Year of birth missing
Year of death missing
English footballers
Association football forwards
Port Vale F.C. players
English Football League players